Ise is a village in Sarpsborg municipality, Norway. Its population is 733.

References

Villages in Østfold
Sarpsborg